"Sofia" is a single by German-Spanish singer-songwriter Álvaro Soler. The song was released as a separate single after "El mismo sol" and "Agosto". "Sofia" was not included in Soler's original debut album, Eterno Agosto, in 2015, nor in the 2015 Italian and Spanish deluxe editions, but it did appear on the Eterno Agosto international 2016 edition as well as the 2016 Italian reissue of the album.

The song was a big hit first in Italy climbing in three weeks after release to the top of the Italian FIMI chart and the Italian Airplay chart, and it proved to be a pan-European and international hit for Álvaro Soler. The music video for the song was shot in Havana, Cuba. The single went eight times platinum in Italy and two times platinum in Spain.

Formats and track listings
Digital download
"Sofia" – 3:30

CD single
"Sofia" – 3:30	
"Volar" – 3:01

Remix
"Sofia" (B-Case Remix) – 3:16	
"Sofia" (Oovee Remix) – 3:44	
"Sofia" (Robin Grubert Remix) – 3:21

Charts and certifications

Weekly charts

Year-end charts

Certifications

References

2016 songs
2016 singles
Spanish-language songs
Álvaro Soler songs
Songs written by Simon Triebel
Number-one singles in Italy
Number-one singles in Poland
Number-one singles in Switzerland
Ultratop 50 Singles (Flanders) number-one singles
Pop-folk songs
Songs written by Jakke Erixson
Songs written by RedOne
Songs written by Álvaro Soler